Ptichopus angulatus is a beetle of the Family Passalidae.

Gallery

Passalidae